Federico Cappellazzo (born 16 September 1980 in Turin, Piedmont) is an Italian freestyle swimmer.

Cappellazzo's major achievement is the victory with the Italian relay in Berlin 2002.
He participated for Italy in the Summer Olympic of Athens 2004.

See also
 Swimming at the 2004 Summer Olympics – Men's 4 × 200 metre freestyle relay
 Cappellazzo's entry on Italian Wikipedia

References
 Federico Cappellazzo on agendadiana.com
 Federico Cappellazzo on Italian Swimming Federation's website

External links
 
 
 
 
 

1980 births
Living people
Sportspeople from Turin
Italian male swimmers
Olympic swimmers of Italy
Swimmers at the 2004 Summer Olympics
Olympic bronze medalists for Italy
Olympic bronze medalists in swimming
Italian male freestyle swimmers
European Aquatics Championships medalists in swimming
Medalists at the 2004 Summer Olympics
Universiade medalists in swimming
Universiade gold medalists for Italy
Universiade bronze medalists for Italy
Swimmers of Centro Sportivo Carabinieri
Medalists at the 2003 Summer Universiade